Martín de León Cárdenas, O.S.A. (1585 – 15 November 1655) was a Roman Catholic prelate who served as Archbishop of Palermo (1650–1655),
Bishop of Pozzuoli (1631–1650), 
and Bishop of Trivento (1630–1631).

Biography
Martín de León Cárdenas was born in Archidona, Spain in 1585 and ordained a priest in the Order of Saint Augustine.
On 13 May 1630, he was appointed during the papacy of Pope Urban VIII as Bishop of Trivento.
On 20 May 1630, he was consecrated bishop by Laudivio Zacchia, Cardinal-Priest of San Pietro in Vincoli. 
On 7 April 1631, he was appointed during the papacy of Pope Urban VIII as Bishop of Pozzuoli.
On 27 August 1650, he was appointed during the papacy of Pope Innocent X as Archbishop of Palermo.
He served as Archbishop of Palermo until his death on 15 November 1655.

Between 1608 and 1615 Cárdenas wrote a picaresque novel, The Orphan's Story, describing a young boy's travels in the Spanish Empire, with locations including Lima, Potosi, Puerto Rico and Cadiz, and accounts of Sir Francis Drake's attack on Puerto Rico and the sacking of Cádiz. The  Puerto Rico account includes a letter from one of the generals who fought Drake there. Cardenas arranged for the novel's publication in 1621 under the nom de plume of Andrés de León, but it remained unpublished, and the manuscript was only rediscovered in 1965.

Episcopal succession
While bishop, he was the principal co-consecrator of:
Gaspar de Borja y Velasco, Archbishop of Seville (1630);
Tommaso d'Ancora (Ariconi), Bishop of Mottola (1630); and
Gil Carrillo de Albornoz, Archbishop of Taranto (1630).

References

External links and additional sources
 (for Chronology of Bishops) 
 (for Chronology of Bishops) 
 (for Chronology of Bishops)
 (for Chronology of Bishops)
 (for Chronology of Bishops) 
 (for Chronology of Bishops) 

17th-century Italian Roman Catholic archbishops
Bishops appointed by Pope Urban VIII
Bishops appointed by Pope Innocent X
1585 births
1655 deaths
Augustinian bishops
People from Archidona
Bishops of Pozzuoli